Indrek Toome (19 September 1943 – 28 February 2023) was a Soviet and Estonian communist politician and, after the restoration of Estonia's independence in 1991, an entrepreneur. In 1988–1990 he was the head of the Council of Ministers — informally the "prime minister" — in then Soviet-occupied Estonia.

Biography 
Toome was born in Tallinn on 19 September 1943, during the 1941–1944 German occupation of Estonia during World War II. He completed his studies in 1968 as an electrical engineer at the Tallinn Polytechnic Institute (now Tallinn University of Technology).

From 1972 to 1990, Toome held various senior posts in the Estonian branch of the Soviet Young Communist League (Komsomol) and the regional organization of the Soviet Union's  Communist Party in the Estonian SSR.

From 16 November 1988 until 3 April 1990, Toome was chairman of the Council of Ministers of the Estonian SSR, a position similar to head of provincial government, in then Soviet-controlled Estonia. It was under his leadership that the local Soviet authorities began to succumb to pressure from the Singing Revolution, the peaceful popular liberation of Estonia from the 1944–1991 Soviet occupation. With the collapse of Soviet regime in Estonia, on 3 April 1990, after the first free elections in the country since before World War II, he peacefully handed over his office to Edgar Savisaar. On 20 August 1991, Estonia restored its full independence.

In 1990-1992, Toome was elected member of the last Soviet Estonian parliament (Ülemnõukogu). On 20 August 1991, he was among the 69 members of parliament who declared the illegal Soviet occupation and annexation of the country terminated, and proclaimed the full restoration of the independence of Estonia. 

After 1992, Toome was a partner at an estate agency. In 1995, he was convicted by the Tallinn District Court and fined for an attempt to bribe an official of the Estonian Internal Security Service (KAPO).

References

1943 births
2023 deaths
Politicians from Tallinn
Members of the Congress of People's Deputies of the Soviet Union
Communist Party of Estonia politicians
Resigned Communist Party of the Soviet Union members
Heads of government of the Estonian Soviet Socialist Republic
Members of the Supreme Soviet of the Estonian Soviet Socialist Republic, 1971–1975
Members of the Supreme Soviet of the Estonian Soviet Socialist Republic, 1975–1980
Members of the Supreme Soviet of the Estonian Soviet Socialist Republic, 1980–1985
Members of the Supreme Soviet of the Estonian Soviet Socialist Republic, 1985–1990
Voters of the Estonian restoration of Independence
Estonian businesspeople
Tallinn University of Technology alumni
Recipients of the Order of Friendship of Peoples